Gaspar is a human name.

Gaspar may also refer to:

 Gaspar, Santa Catarina, a town in Brazil
 Gaspar, Cuba
 Gașpar, Moldova
 Gaspar, Gaspra or Gasparalı, Autonomous Republic of Crimea
 Gaspar Strait, a waterway in Indonesia

See also

 
 Gasper (disambiguation)
 Caspar (disambiguation)